Marquess of Grisolía  is a hereditary  title of Spanish nobility. It was created on 13 May 2014 by King Juan Carlos I of Spain in favor of Santiago Grisolía García, biochemist, researcher and teacher.

Marquesses of Grisolía (2014)
 Santiago Grisolía García, 1st Marquess of Grisolía (2014–2022)

References

Marquessates in the Spanish nobility
Noble titles created in 2014